The Ordinances of Corporations Act 1503 (19 Hen 7 c 7) was an Act of the Parliament of England.

The whole Act was repealed by section 1(1) of, and Part V of Schedule 1 to, the Statute Law (Repeals) Act 1993.

Section 3
This section was repealed by the Statute Law Revision Act 1887.

References
Halsbury's Statutes,

External links
The Ordinances of Corporations Act 1503, as amended from the National Archives.
The Ordinances of Corporations Act 1503, as amended on 1 February 1991 from the National Archives.

Acts of the Parliament of England (1485–1603)
1503 in law
1503 in England